is a railway station located in the town of  Nishiwaga, Iwate Prefecture, Japan, operated by the East Japan Railway Company (JR East).

Lines
Yudakōgen Station is served by the Kitakami Line, and is located 39.1 km from the terminus of the line at Kitakami Station.

Station layout
The station has one side platform serving a single bi-directional track. The station is unattended.

History
The station was absorbed into the JR East network upon the privatization of the Japan National Railways (JNR) on April 1, 1987. The station was renamed to its present name on June 20, 1991.

Surrounding area
 
Akita Expressway – Yuda IC

See also
 List of railway stations in Japan

References

External links

 

Railway stations in Iwate Prefecture
Kitakami Line
Railway stations in Japan opened in 1948
Nishiwaga, Iwate
Stations of East Japan Railway Company